Peter Clausen (born 13 April 1964) is a Danish former cyclist. He competed in two events at the 1988 Summer Olympics.

References

External links
 

1964 births
Living people
Danish male cyclists
Olympic cyclists of Denmark
Cyclists at the 1988 Summer Olympics
People from Rødovre
Sportspeople from the Capital Region of Denmark